The University of Puerto Rico in Cayey (UPR-Cayey) is a public university in Cayey, Puerto Rico. It is part of the University of Puerto Rico System. It was initially founded as a regional school in 1967 and became a college in 1969. It was awarded autonomy in April 1982.

Academics 

UPR Cayey awards bachelor's degrees.  It serves as a starting point for students interested in applying to programs in the Medical Sciences Campus or at Mayagüez Campus.

Research
UPR-Cayey has undergraduate research programs such as Howard Hughes Project, the NIH MBRS-RISE program and the PR-AMP program. These programs provide research experience for students of the Natural Sciences, promoting student participation in scientific research.  These programs provide funding and facilitate the experiences of science undergraduate students to do research either locally, at other campuses of Puerto Rico, or in Universities in the U.S.

The University houses the Environmental Education Center. The Institute for Interdisciplinary Research, supports students and teachers in colleges of neighboring municipalities in research projects. The Project for the Study of Women seeks to advance women's rights through education, research and community service. These programs are offered to students such as those taking college courses before completing their secondary education or professionals who wish to take continuing education courses.

Academic departments

Arts

 Department of Humanities
 Department of Hispanic Studies
 Department of English
 Department of Social Sciences

Natural Sciences
 Natural Sciences Program
 Department of Biology
 Department of Chemistry
 Department of Mathematics-Physics

Professional Schools
 Department of Education
 Physical Education Program
 Department of Business Administration
 Technology and Office Administration Program

See also

2010 University of Puerto Rico Strike

References

External links
 Official website

Cay
Cayey, Puerto Rico
1967 establishments in Puerto Rico
Educational institutions established in 1967
Liga Atletica Interuniversitaria de Puerto Rico